Immortal Admiral Yi Sun-sin (lit. "The Immortal Yi Sun-sin") is a South Korean television series based on the life of Yi Sun-sin, starring Kim Myung-min in the title role. It aired on KBS1 on Saturdays and Sundays at 21:45 from September 4, 2004 to August 28, 2005 for 104 episodes.

The series filmed on location at the actual battle sites. It made extensive use of rendered images and a reconstruction of a turtle ship. Due to the preparation needed, the show took many months to produce.

Plot
It is late 1598, shortly before the Battle of Noryang, the final confrontation of the Imjin War. The remnants of the Japanese invasion force are desperate to go home, but are also driven by personal motivation to beat their greatest adversary, Admiral Yi Sun-sin, once and for all. Self-serving Ming generals and Joseon officials also fear Yi's growing popularity and its impact on their personal base of power. These incidentally combining ambitions fan King Seonjo's paranoia and make him eventually fear that Yi might come after his throne, and after a series of what he calls acts of high treason, he decides to have Yi arrested.

Yi, on the other hand, is determined to teach the Japanese a lesson for the atrocities they committed on the Korean people, and despite orders to remain quiet while the Japanese are to pull out without anymore bloodshed, he rallies his naval force and prepares for the upcoming engagement. The battle commences and the Japanese are dealt a crippling blow, but Yi is fatally wounded by an arquebuse bullet. As he lies dying, the plot backtracks on the important events of Yi's life, from his boyhood to his military career, his efforts before and during the Japanese invasion, his disgrace at the hands of his king, and his reinstatement, back to the battle of Noryang, where he succumbs to his wound just as victory is declared.

Cast

Main characters
Kim Myung-min as Yi Sun-sin
 Yoo Seung-ho as young Sun-sin
Choi Jae-sung as Won Gyun
Lee Jae-ryong as Yu Seong-ryong, Prime Minister of Joseon
Choi Cheol-ho as King Seonjo
Kim Kyu-chul as Im Chun-soo

Supporting characters

Choi Sung-joon as Yi Eok-gi
Choi Yoo-jung as Bang Yeon-hwa
Kim Gyu-ri as Park Mi-jin/Park Cho-hee
Park Dong-bin as Han Ho
Jeon Ye-seo as Chung-hyang
Lee Han-wi as Chun Moo-jik
Ahn Yeon-hong as Hong-yi
Lee Han-gal as Nal-bal, Yi Sun-Sin's bodyguard
Jung Ae-ri as Yi Sun-sin's mother
Ahn Hong-jin as Yi Wan, Yi Sun-Sin's nephew
Son Jong-beom as So Ŭn-woo
Lee In as Prince Gwanghae
Gi Ju-bong as Yoon Hwan-shi, a young officer promoted by Yi to the post of naval engineer
Kim Joon-mo as Yi San-hae
Jung Dong-hwan as Yun Doo-su
Lee Won-bal as Yun Geun-su
Im Hyuk-joo as Jeong Tak
Hwang Joon-wook as Yi Deok-hyung
Park Chan-hwan as Kwon Joon
Ahn Sŭng-hun as Jung Woon
Jung Jin-gak as Shin Ho
Jeon Hyun as Yi Sun-sin
Park Chul-min as Kim Wan
Kim Myung-gook as Song Hui-rip
Lee Sang-in as Na Dae-yong, inventor of the Geobukseon
Kim Hong-pyo as Joo Soo-chang
Park Hye-sook as Neob Chool-nye
Lee Jae-pyo as Woo Chi-juk
Choi Joon-young as Lee Woon-ryong
Yoo Tae-woong as Lee Young-nam
Lee Il-jae as Yi Il
Lee Hyo-jung as Toyotomi Hideyoshi
Lee Jung-yong as Katō Kiyomasa
Jung Sŭng-ho as Konishi Yukinaga
Choi Dong-joon as Tōdō Takatora
Kim Myung-soo as Wakisaka Yasuharu
Hwang Joon-won as Sō Yoshitoshi
 Lee Soon-jae as Yi Hwang
Choi Dang-seok as Sa Hwa-dong
 Kwak Jung-wook as Sen no Rikyū
Kim Jong-kyeol as Shotai
Lee Kyung-young as Genso
Kim Si-won as Kobayakawa Takakage
Shin Dong-hoon as Nagaoka Tadaoki
Kim Ha-kyun as Chen Lin
Song Geum-sik as Hwang Se-deuk
 Kim Ki-doo
 Ko Kyu-pil as Dol Soe

 Yoon Yong-hyun as Woo wul gi nae
 Sun Dong-hyuk as Manni eunggae
 Maeng Ho-rim as Yi Kyung-lok

Artistic license in the series
The drama has been the focus of some attention due to historical inaccuracies, explained away with artistic license, though it concerns some that it may be promoting itself as based on fact.

When Admiral Yi is portrayed as a boy, he is shown to be a weak, shy, and lonely boy though common belief is that he had leadership and creativity at an early age. Nevertheless, he is portrayed to display those qualities as a growing man, unable to avert his eyes from social injustice.

Instead of vilifying Won Gyun, a Korean admiral who contributed to the jailing of Admiral Yi for jealous reasons, Won Gyun is portrayed as a strong and smart, but very hot-tempered man who befriends and leads Yi throughout his early life. This deviates from the common belief that Won Gyun had always conspired against Yi. In the show, his jealousy and rivalry is portrayed in his later years as a veteran commander when he begins to show his arrogance as one of Joseon's strongest warriors, refusing to follow along with what he deems to be Yi's cowardly tactics and treachery to the king. His betrayal to Yi is explained through the show's ongoing politics and his inability to distinguish military merits from protection of the people. There is much debate about this positive portrayal of Won Gyun as recent research suggests that he may have been excessively vilified during the Park Chung-hee administration. Reception and reviews have since been positive with much praise for the show's emphasis for humanity and their portrayal of Won Gyun.

Awards and nominations
2004 4th KBS Right Language Awards: Kim Myung-min
2005 41st Baeksang Arts Awards: Best TV Director - Lee Sung-joo
2005 41st Baeksang Arts Awards: Best TV Drama (nominated)
2005 41st Baeksang Arts Awards: Best TV Actor - Kim Myung-min (nominated)
2005 18th Grimae Awards: Best Actor - Kim Myung-min
2005 KBS Drama Awards: Best Supporting Actor - Park Chul-min
2005 KBS Drama Awards: Grand Prize (Daesang) - Kim Myung-min
2006 18th Producers Awards of Korea: Best Performer - Kim Myung-min
2006 33rd Korean Broadcasting Awards: Best TV Actor - Kim Myung-min

International broadcast
The series also aired in the United States and China in 2005 via KBS World.

Notes

References

External links
Immortal Admiral Yi Sun-sin official KBS website 

Television series set in the Joseon dynasty
2004 South Korean television series debuts
2005 South Korean television series endings
Korean Broadcasting System television dramas
Korean-language television shows
Cultural depictions of Yi Sun-sin
Television shows based on South Korean novels
South Korean historical television series
South Korean action television series
Martial arts television series
Japan in non-Japanese culture